Francisco Pinto de Castro (born 1 April 1910 - unknown) was a Portuguese footballer who played as a forward.

External links 
 
 

1910 births
Portuguese footballers
Association football forwards
FC Porto players
Portugal international footballers
Year of death missing